Achilles Nikolayevich Alferaki ("Achilles" sometimes spelled Akhilles or Ahilles) (July 3, 1846, Kharkov, Russian Empire – December 27, 1919, Saint Petersburg, Soviet Union) was a Russian composer and mayor of Greek descent. His brother was Sergei Alphéraky.

Biography 

Alferaki was born in Kharkov, present-day Ukraine, to Nikos and Maria Alferakis. He spent his childhood in Taganrog, present-day Rostov Oblast, in the magnificent Alferaki Palace on Catholic Street (now Frunze Street) designed by the architect Andrei Stackenschneider.

Alferaki was educated at home before attending the historical and philological faculty at Moscow University. There he also studied music theory. In 1870, he returned to Taganrog in order to run the family business. Following the death of the city's governor Lev Kulchitsky in 1873, he served briefly as acting governor. During the 1880s, he served as mayor of Taganrog until 1888, when he moved to Saint Petersburg. There he became Chancellor of the Ministry of Internal Affairs in 1891 and later Director of the Russian Telegraph Agency.

Alferaki died in Saint Petersburg in 1919. One of his family's descendants was Anna Marly, a Russian-born French singer and songwriter, author of Chant des Partisans and a Chevalier of the Légion d'Honneur.

Mayor of Taganrog 

In 1880, Alferaki was elected Mayor (городской голова) of Taganrog. During his tenure, he made many useful public affairs. He made Taganrog beautiful and clean and took part in establishing different charitable institutions. During his mayor’s period of office, the city's streets and roads were covered with cobblestones, trees were planted along the pavements, and the first boulevards were introduced. Mayor Alferaki contributed to the establishment of The Society for the Relief of the Aged Poor, established in 1883, and to development of elementary education system in the city.

At the city council meetings, Achilles Nikolaevich Alferaki introduced many new proposals. Some of them looked fantastic and wasteful for Taganrog's politicians, but some of them were realized. For example, Alferaki's proposals to erect a monument to Peter I The Great and to make a major reconstruction of Taganrog's harbor were realized.

Even his mayoralty could not make him forget his passion - the music. He took part in the activity of Taganrog's Music and Dramatic Society. The first music classes and a symphony orchestra, directed by famous hand-master and composer Václav Suk opened in Taganrog.

Music 

Music lovers, like Alferaki himself helped Taganrog become known as one of the most music-loving cities in the South of Russia. In 1880, when the Greek composer lived in Taganrog in his mansion on the Catholic Street, he gathered the whole beau monde of the city. Achilles Alferaki was also a talented artist. A large collection of caricatures is now kept at the Taganrog Museum of Local Lore and History and at the Literary Museum named after Chekhov. With these rare sketches and drawings, we have a chance of seeing the people, who lived in Taganrog some hundred years ago through the eyes of a contemporary, getting the spirit of parties and balls of that time.

Alferaki devoted much of his time to music. In the former capital of the Russian Empire he wrote more than 100 romances, compositions and two operas St. John's Eve and The Erl King.

External links and references
 Таганрог. Энциклопедия, Таганрог, издательство АНТОН, 2008
 Alferaki Palace
 Sergei Alphéraky
 Official Web Site of the City of Taganrog, English
 Official Web Site of the City of Taganrog, Russian
 

1846 births
1919 deaths
Musicians from Kharkiv
People from Kharkov Governorate
People from the Russian Empire of Greek descent
Nobility from the Russian Empire
Governors of Taganrog
Russian opera composers
Greek classical composers
Male opera composers
Composers from the Russian Empire
Russian people of Greek descent
Russian male classical composers
19th-century Greek musicians
20th-century Greek musicians
Politicians from Kharkiv